The  2018–19 Estonian Cup was the 29th season of the Estonian main domestic football knockout tournament. Narva Trans won their second title after defeating Nõmme Kalju in the final and qualified for the first qualifying round of the UEFA Europa League.

First round (1/64)
The draw was made by Estonian Football Association on 19 May 2018.
League level of the club in the brackets.
Rahvaliiga RL (people's league) is a league organized by Estonian Football Association, but not part of the main league system.

Byes
These teams were not drawn and secured a place in the second round without playing:
 Meistriliiga (Level 1): JK Narva Trans, Nõmme Kalju FC, JK Tallinna Kalev, Paide Linnameeskond
 Esiliiga (2): Rakvere JK Tarvas, FC Flora U21, Tartu FC Santos, FC Elva, Tartu JK Welco
 Esiliiga B (3): FC Flora U19, FC Nõmme United
 II Liiga (4): Raasiku FC Joker, JK Sillamäe Kalev, Tallinna JK Piraaja, Jõgeva SK Noorus-96, Maardu United, Viimsi JK, FC Otepää, Pärnu JK Poseidon, Kohtla-Järve JK Järve II
 III Liiga (5): Tallinna FC Zapoos, FC Zenit Tallinn, Nõmme Kalju FC III, Tallinna FC Eston Villa, FC Vastseliina, Tartu FC Helios, Tallinna JK Augur, FC Järva-Jaani, FC Kose, JK Kernu Kadakas
 IV Liiga (6): Tallinna Depoo, Tallinna JK Jalgpallihaigla, FC Lelle, Tartu FC Helios II, FC Äksi Wolves
 Rahvaliiga (RL): FC Teleios, FC Maksatransport

Second round (1/32)
The draw for the second round was made on 19 June 2018.

Third round (1/16) 
The draw for the third round was made on 19 July 2018.

Fourth round  (1/8)
The draw for the fourth round was made on 24 August 2018.

Quarter-finals
The draw for the fourth round was made on 2 March 2019. Maardu Linnameeskond and JK Tabasalu advanced a league level between 2018 and 2019 league seasons.

Semi-finals
The draw was made on 25 April 2019.

Final
Final was played on 25 May 2019 at A. Le Coq Arena.

See also
 2018 Meistriliiga
 2018 Esiliiga
 2018 Esiliiga B

References

External links
 Official website 

Estonian Cup seasons
Cup
Estonian
2019 in Estonian football